Age of Success (also known as Taste of Heaven) is a 1988 South Korean film written and directed by Jang Sun-woo.

Synopsis
The Age of Success is a melodrama about lust for success and revenge at a company that makes sweeteners.

Cast
Ahn Sung-ki as Kim Bang-chul
Lee Hye-young
Choi Bong

Notes

Bibliography

External links 
 
 

1988 films
1980s Korean-language films
Films directed by Jang Sun-woo
South Korean drama films
1988 drama films